Irina Odăgescu-Țuțuianu (born 1937) is a Romanian music educator and composer.

Biography
Irina Odăgescu was born on 23 May 1937 in Bucharest, and studied at the Bucharest Music Conservatoire with Tudor Ciortea and Andrei Vieru. She also took summer courses with Iannis Xenakis, György Ligeti and Karlheinz Stockhausen. After completing her studies, she became a professor at the Bucharest Conservatoire.

Odăgescu's works have been performed internationally in Europe, Asia and the United States, and she has lectured at international conferences held in the University of Pau in France and in Fairbanks University, Alaska. She has co-written the texts Practical Studies for Reading in Keys for Two Voices in 1972, and Practical Studies for Reading in Old Choral Keys in 1982.

Honors and awards
The Romanian Union of Composers’ Prize (1978–2004)
The Romanian Academy’s George Enescu Prize (2001)
The Viotti- Valesia Prize (Italy)
The ‘Ciudad Ibague’ Silver Medal (Columbia)

Works
Odăgescu has composed symphonic, choral, ballet and chamber music. Selected works include:
Youth Everlasting and Life Without End (2005)
The Pyre of Bread
Tall Song, Ballet
Melos, Sonata for viola solo, Op.48 (1982)

References

1937 births
Living people
20th-century classical composers
Romanian classical composers

Women classical composers
National University of Music Bucharest alumni
Academic staff of the National University of Music Bucharest
21st-century classical composers
Enescu Prize winners
20th-century women composers
21st-century women composers
Musicians from Bucharest